East Waupun is an unincorporated community located in the town of Chester, Dodge County, Wisconsin, United States. It is located about 1 mile (2 km) east of Waupun on Wisconsin Highway 49.

Notes

Unincorporated communities in Dodge County, Wisconsin
Unincorporated communities in Wisconsin